Londonderry is an unincorporated village and census-designated place (CDP) in the town of Londonderry, Windham County, Vermont, United States. As of the 2020 census, it had a population of 180, compared to 1,919 in the entire town.

The CDP is in northwestern Windham County, in the northern part of the town of Londonderry. It sits in the valley of the West River, where it is joined from the north by Utley Brook. The West River is a south-flowing tributary of the Connecticut River.

Vermont Routes 11 and 100 combine to form the village's Main Street. Route 11 leads east  to Chester and west over the Green Mountains  to Manchester Center, while Route 100 leads north  to Ludlow and south  to Jamaica.

References 

Populated places in Windham County, Vermont
Census-designated places in Windham County, Vermont
Census-designated places in Vermont